Cotinis nitida, commonly known as the green June beetle, June bug or June beetle, is a beetle of the family Scarabaeidae. It is found in the eastern United States and Canada, where it is most abundant in the South.  It is sometimes confused with the related southwestern species figeater beetle Cotinis mutabilis, which is less destructive.

The green June beetle is active during daylight hours. Their habitat extends from New Brunswick to Georgia, and as far west as California, with possible population crossover in Texas with their western cousin, the figeater beetle.

Life cycle 
The complete life cycle for the green June beetle is one year.

Egg 
Mating occurs in the early morning.  The male is attracted by a strongly scented milky fluid secreted by the female.  Mating lasts only a few minutes after which the female enters her burrow or crawls under matted grass.  Once the mating process has taken place, the female will lay between 60 and 75 eggs underground during a two-week period. The eggs, when first laid, appear white and elliptical in shape, gradually becoming more spherical as the larvae develop. The eggs hatch in approximately 18 days into small, white grubs.

Larva 

The larvae will molt twice before winter. The fully grown larva color is glassy yellowish white shading toward green or blue at the head and tail. The larva has stiff ambulatory bristles on its abdomen which assist movement. The larva normally travels on its back. The underground speed is considered more rapid than any other known genus of Scarabaeidae in the United States and is comparable to that of the hairy caterpillar. The larvae feed largely on humus and mold but can do considerable damage to plant root systems. Injury has been reported to vegetables and ornamental plants, particularly those which have been mulched. The larvae are considered pests when they cause damage to lawns or turf grasses. The insect is considered more injurious in its larval stages than as a beetle. Pupation occurs after the third larval stage, which lasts nearly nine months. The pupal stage occurs in an oval cocoon constructed of dirt particles fastened together by a viscid fluid excreted by the larva. The pupa is white when first formed but develops greenish tints just before emergence.

Adult 

The adults begin to appear in June after 18 days of the pupation period. The color varies from dull brown with green stripes to a uniform metallic green. The margins of the elytra vary from light brown to orange yellow. The adult beetle will feed upon a variety of fruits including berries, grapes, peaches, nectarines, apples, pears and figs. Adults are particularly attracted to rotting fruit which often occurs after an initial damage to sound fruit.

Predation 
The grubs of the beetle are largely held in control by natural predators.

Insects 
The larval stages of the  friendly fly or large flesh fly (Sarcophaga aldrichi) have been observed attached near the base of the head and thorax of the adult beetle. The fly larvae have been observed inside the devoured thorax and abdomen of the beetle.

The flesh fly (Sarcophaga helicobia) has been observed to prey on both the larva and adult stage of the June beetle.

The digger wasp (Scolia dubia) attacks the larval stage of the beetle.  The female will crawl into the larva burrow and lay her eggs on the grub.

Vertebrates 

Below ground, large number of larvae are consumed by moles.  During rainy periods, when the burrows of the larvae are flooded, the larvae will crawl to the surface.  At these times, the larvae are subject to predation by raccoons, gophers, skunks, opossums, and chipmunks.
Birds, notably the American crow, common  grackle, northern mockingbird and blue jay, will also attack the adult.

Control 

One of the most effective controls is used during the larva stage.  Beetle larvae can be controlled using milky spore disease (Bacillus popilliae), which occurs naturally in some larvae. Milky spore treatment was first developed by the USDA in the 1930s to combat the Japanese beetle but milky spore controls the June bug and Oriental beetle as well. Milky spore treatment was the first microbial product ever registered in the
US. Milky spore begins working after treatment wherever larvae are feeding. In warm climates, milky spore disease can achieve control in two to three years. Colder climates may require longer.  The soil is inoculated annually for three to five years and once the treatment is established, it is effective for 10 years or more dependent upon climate conditions.

References

Beetles of North America
Cetoniinae
Beetles described in 1758
Taxa named by Carl Linnaeus